__notoc__
The Freiburg school is a school of economic thought founded in the 1930s at the University of Freiburg.

It builds somewhat on the earlier historical school of economics but stresses that only some forms of competition are good, while others may require oversight. This is considered a lawful and legitimate role of government in a democracy in the Freiburg School. The School provided the economic theoretical elements of ordoliberalism and the social market economy in post-war Germany.

The Freiburg school of economics was called 'neoliberalism' until Anglo-American scholars reappropriated the term.

Adherents

 Franz Böhm
 Juergen B. Donges
 Ludwig Erhard
 Walter Eucken
 Edith Eucken-Erdsiek
 Andreas Freytag
 
 
 Paul Hensel
 Michael Hüther
 
 Friedrich A. Lutz
 Karl-Friedrich Maier
 
 
 
 Hans-Werner Sinn

Wilhelm Röpke (from Austrian School), Alfred Müller-Armack and Alexander Rüstow were not members of the Freiburg School but did provide, together with the Freiburg School, the foundations of ordoliberalism.

See also  
 Freiburg Circles  
ORDO (journal)
Social market economy
Historical school of economics

References

Sources
 p. 315.
Gabler Verlag (Herausgeber), Gabler Wirtschaftslexikon, Stichwort: Freiburger Schule (online)

External links
 EconStor: The Freiburg School: Walter Eucken and Ordoliberalism

 
Economic history of Germany